A kahuna is a Hawaiian priest, sorcerer, magician, wizard, minister, or expert in any profession.

Kahuna may also refer to:
 Kahuna (company), a software company
 FC Kahuna, a musical production team
 Dodge Kahuna, an automobile
 Kahoona (or Great Kahoona), a character in the Gidget novels by Frederick Kohner and related films
 Kehuna, the formation of the Kohanim (Jewish priests of patrilineal descent of Ahron)

See also 
 Big Kahuna (disambiguation)
 Kahana (disambiguation)